Fulco of Ireland (fl. 8th/9th century) was an Irish soldier.

Biography

Fulco was an Irish soldier who came to France with four thousand Irishmen to serve Charlemagne. He married a woman named Da Spettini and they produced a family called Scotti (Latin for Irish), a surname still found in that part of Italy. He is revered in Pavia as Saint Fulco.

See also

 Andrew the Scot
 Catald
 Deicolus
 Niall Ó Glacáin
 Sholto Douglas

References
 Irish Saints in Italy, Anselmo Tommasini; translated J.F. Scanlan, London, 1937

9th-century Irish people
Medieval Irish saints
Irish soldiers
Irish expatriates in France
Irish expatriates in Italy